Ramon Lee Armstrong (born October 6, 1937, in Ennis, Texas) is a former college and professional American football player.  A defensive tackle, he played college football at Texas Christian University and played professionally in the American Football League for the Oakland Raiders in 1960.

See also
List of American Football League players

1937 births
Living people
People from Ennis, Texas
Players of American football from Texas
American football defensive tackles
TCU Horned Frogs football players
Oakland Raiders players
American Football League players